Alex McKinnon may refer to:

 Alex McKinnon (ice hockey) (1895–1949), Canadian professional ice hockey player
 Alex McKinnon (baseball) (1856–1887), American baseball player
 Alex McKinnon (rugby union) (1878–?), Australian rugby union player
 Alex McKinnon (rugby league) (born 1992), Australian rugby league footballer
 Alex McKinnon (footballer) (1865–1935), Scottish footballer
 Alexander H. McKinnon (1904–1973), Canadian lawyer, judge and politician

See also
 Alex MacKinnon, darts player